Pam Shriver was the defending champion but did not compete that year.

Helena Suková won in the final 7–6, 7–6 against Brenda Schultz.

Seeds
A champion seed is indicated in bold text while text in italics indicates the round in which that seed was eliminated. The top eight seeds received a bye to the second round.

  Helena Suková (champion)
  Pascale Paradis (third round)
  Patty Fendick (semifinals)
  Anne Minter (quarterfinals)
  Hana Mandlíková (second round)
  Nicole Provis (third round)
  Jana Novotná (quarterfinals)
  Rosalyn Fairbank (second round)
  Brenda Schultz (final)
  Catarina Lindqvist (third round)
  Gretchen Magers (quarterfinals)
  Ann Grossman (second round)
  Terry Phelps (first round)
  Etsuko Inoue (first round)
  Dianne Van Rensburg (third round)
  Dianne Balestrat (third round)

Draw

Finals

Top half

Section 1

Section 2

Bottom half

Section 3

Section 4

External links
 WTA tournament draws
 ITF tournament draws

1989 Singles
1989 WTA Tour
1989 in Australian tennis